Elena Belova (born 6 May 1985) is an Uzbekistani football goalkeeping coach and a former footballer who played as a goalkeeper. She has been a member of the Uzbekistan women's national team.

International career
Belova capped for Uzbekistan at senior level during the 2010 AFC Women's Asian Cup qualification.

See also
List of Uzbekistan women's international footballers

References 

1985 births
Living people
Uzbekistani women's footballers
Uzbekistan women's international footballers
Women's association football goalkeepers
Uzbekistani women's futsal players
Association football goalkeeping coaches
20th-century Uzbekistani women
21st-century Uzbekistani women